The 8th National Assembly of Laos was elected by a popular vote on 20 March 2016 and was replaced by the 9th National Assembly on 22 March 2021.

Meetings

Officers

Presidency

Secretariat

Women Caucus

Members

References

Citations

Bibliography
Books:

8th National Assembly of Laos
2016 establishments in Laos
2021 disestablishments in Laos